Apía is a town and municipality in the Department of Risaralda, Colombia. It is located at an elevation of 1,630 metres, about 60 km away from district capital Pereira in the valley of the Apia river. It has approximately 11,000 inhabitants according to the 2018 census. The town has excellent views over Cerro Tatamá, which is part of Tatamá National Natural Park.

History
The area was colonised in 1872 but the town was founded on 15 August 1883 by settlers from Antioquia. Amongst these were José María Marín and his wife María Encarnación de Marín who were the first to build in the area. The settlement was initially called La Villa de las Cáscaras ("Town of the Husks") because the roofs were thatched with cumulú, a native plant.

Town plan
The urban area comprises the boroughs of Jaime Rendón, Bermeja, Centenario, Quince de Agosto, El Clavel, Santa Inés, Villa de las Cáscaras, Acozma I, Motoristas, San Juan, San Vicente, Asovice, Villaserrana and Antonio Nariño.

The rural area is made up of 45 corregimientos: Dos Quebradas, Guarne, San Andrés, San Agustín, La floresta, La Máquina, La sombra, El Manzano, Matecaña, Las Delicias, Bajo Manzanillo, Monte verde, El Jazmín, Alto Manzanillo, Miravalle, San Carlos, El Guanábano, El Quindío, La Equis, El Bosque, El Vergel, El Encanto, San Rafael, Alta Campana, Las Cumbres, Buena Vista, Baja Campana, La María, Valladolid, El Carmelo, El Jardín, Pavero, La Estrella, Alta Estrella, Jordania, La Línea, La Nubia, El Diamante, Agua Bonita, Candelaria, La Farallona, La Garrucha, Las Cabañas, Agualinda y Campo Alegre.

Economy
The economy's mainstay is agriculture, especially coffee. It is located in one of the world's prime coffee growing areas and is the home of the organic coffee movement. The organic coffee movement is led by Francisco Jose "Pacho" Herrera Gallego

Culture
The town is well known for its cultural contributions at a national level, especially its music bands and musicians such as Rubo Marín Pulgarín and Carlos Fernando López Naranjo.
In the months of April, May and June of this year (2019), again three poets of Apía, triumphed in international contests of sonnet in Spanish publishers: Gersaín Antonio Restrepo Agudelo, Juan Hely Morales Bedoya and Francisco Javier López Naranjo.

References

Municipalities of Risaralda Department